The South Carolina High School League (SCHSL) is the organization that rules and regulates school athletics in the state of South Carolina.  Based out of Columbia, the SCHSL serves over 330,000 students at 220 high schools and 200 junior high schools.

History
In 1913, the Inter-High School Athletic and Oratorical Association was founded by delegates from various high schools and the University of South Carolina. By 1920, the organization had expanded its membership and activities to the point where reorganization was necessary. In 1921, a new constitution was adopted and the name was officially changed to the South Carolina High School League. The SCHSL experienced a boom in membership from 1921-1930, going from 30 schools to 121 schools. The constitution was rewritten in 1933 and again 1948 to accommodate further growth. The SCHSL joined the National Federation of State High School Associations in 1948. Ever since 1954, the SCHSL has had 100% of the public schools in the state as members. In 1970 the South Carolina Secondary School Activities Association merged with the league.

Competition

SCHSL sanctions competition in the following sports: baseball, basketball, competitive cheerleading, cross country, football, golf, lacrosse, soccer, softball, swimming, tennis, track & field, volleyball, and wrestling.

The SCHSL operates five classes of competition dependent on the size of a school's student enrollment: 
 AAAAA (quin-A or 5A)
 AAAA (quad-A or 4A)
 AAA (triple-A or 3A)
 AA (double-A or 2A)
 A (one-A or 1A)

Realignment for schools occurs every two years.

AAAAA Football

Class 5A began in 2016 and for the 2020–2022 period, includes the following schools:

References

External links
Official site

Education in South Carolina
High school sports associations in the United States
Sports organizations established in 1913
High school sports in South Carolina